Parliamentary elections were held in Czechoslovakia on 23 and 24 May 1986. The National Front put forward a single list of candidates for both the House of the People (the lower house) and the House of Nations (the upper house) and one NF candidate ran in each single member constituency. With a total of 350 seats in the two Houses, 242 were assigned to the Communist Party of Czechoslovakia, 18 to the Czechoslovak People's Party, 18 to the Czechoslovak Socialist Party, four to the Party of Slovak Revival, four to the Freedom Party and 64 to independents. Voter turnout was reported to be 99.39%.

Like the other elections of the Communist era, the result was a foregone conclusion. People were afraid not to vote, and when they did so, those who entered a voting booth to modify their ballot paper could expect to be persecuted by the state.

Results

House of the People

House of Nations

References

Czechoslovakia
Parliamentary
Elections in Communist Czechoslovakia
One-party elections
Single-candidate elections
Czechoslovakia